Unio Itineraria was a German scientific society  which was based at Esslingen am Neckar in Baden-Württemberg, Germany. 
The organisation  paid botanists to travel and collect plants, and sold the collections in large sets.
Rising costs associated with the Wilhelm Schimper expeditions led to the collapse of Unio Itineraria in 1842. Significant portions  of the Unio Itineraria collections were directed  to  Herbarium Tubingense at the University of Tübingen in Baden-Württemberg

History
Supported by William I of Württemberg (1781–1864), Unio Itineraria was established ca. 1825 to promote scientific investigation through the collection and distribution of determined (identified) plant specimens. Unio Itineraria was  organized by  botanist Christian Ferdinand Friedrich Hochstetter (1787–1860) and physician  Ernst Gottlieb von Steudel (1783–1856). 

The directors of Unio Itineraria raised funds through subscribers to the project to pay for expeditions and sold specimens as a dealership. The organization also sold birds, insects and libraries often as intermediaries and maintained agents. Several collectors are associated with the Unio Itineraria notably the organizers Ernst Gottlieb von Steudel  and Christian Ferdinand Friedrich Hochstetter
as well as the explorer collectors: 
Christian Friedrich Ecklon (1795 –1868) Expedition to South Africa
Friedrich Welwitsch (1806 –1872) Expeditions to Portugal, Madeira, Canary Islands, Angola
 Anton Wiest  (1801-1835) Expedition to Egypt
Theodor Kotschy (1813–1866) Botanical research throughout the Middle East and northern Africa
Wilhelm Schimper (1804-1878) Expeditions to Algeria, Austria, Ethiopia, Egypt, France, Germany, Greece, Saudi Arabia and Syria

References

Scientific societies based in Germany